Laws' Cause is the third album by jazz flautist Hubert Laws released on the Atlantic label in 1969.

Reception
The Allmusic review by Al Campbell awarded the album 3 stars calling it "an interesting and entertaining combination of hard bop and crossover jazz".

Track listing
All compositions by Hubert Laws except as indicated
 "No More" - 2:30
 "If You Knew" -  4:31
 "A Day with You" (John Murtaugh) - 3:35
 "Please Let Go" - 3:05
 "Shades of Light" - 6:45
 "Trio for Flute, Bassoon and Piano" (Chick Corea) - 5:09
 "Windows" (Corea) - 8:43
Recorded in New York City on August 10, 1966 (track 7) and at A&R Studios in New York City on February 9, 1968 (tracks 2 & 4) and March 27, 1968 (tracks 1, 3, 5 & 6)

Personnel
Hubert Laws - flute, piccolo
Jimmy Owens - trumpet
Karl Porter - bassoon
Chick Corea - piano
Roland Hanna - harpsichord
Kenny Burrell - guitar
Sam Brown - sitar
Ron Carter - bass
Chuck Rainey - electric bass
Grady Tate - drums
Melba Moore - vocals

References

1969 albums
Atlantic Records albums
Hubert Laws albums